Larim (also Romanized as Lārīm) is a village in Larim Rural District, Gil Khuran District, Juybar County, Mazandaran Province, Iran. At the 2006 census, its population was 4,768, in 1,243 families.

References 

Populated places in Juybar County